Melchor "Mel" Gongora Chavez is a Filipino politician and perennial candidate and radio and print journalist.

Biography
Chavez was born on August 6, 1951 in Kidapawan City, Cotabato. He ran for the Senate in 2004 with fellow Kilusang Bagong Lipunan candidate Oliver Lozano but failed. Melchor Chavez had tried to run for senator in past elections. In 1992, the Supreme Court disqualified him from running for senator. In 1998, Comelec did not give due course to his certificate of candidacy. In 2001, Chavez ran as the official candidate of the KBL; he garnered a measly 2% of the total votes cast. COMELEC allowed him to run again in 2004, but allies of another Chavez—Alyansa ng Pag-Asa candidate Francisco Chavez, the same candidate who questioned Melchor’s candidacy in 1992—sought Melchor’s disqualification. COMELEC eventually declared Melchor as a nuisance candidate.

In 2016, alongside Aldin Ali, he went under the PMM ticket, where he is the leader, but again failed to win a seat in the Senate.

References
Chavez's Profile

1951 births
Living people
Kilusang Bagong Lipunan politicians
Labor Party Philippines politicians
People from Cotabato